Dakabin State High School is a large secondary school located at Dakabin, a suburb of Brisbane, Queensland, Australia. Dakabin is a co-educational school with approximately 5’000students enrolling every year.

Social climate 

Dakabin is divided into six-year levels, with 3 levels of schooling. Junior, Middle & Senior each having a Deputy Principal and Year Coordinator. On a weekly basis, each year level gathers on an assembly to discuss important issues of the week and upcoming events. The staff team of Dakabin comprises a Principal, three Deputy Principals, a Head of Special Education, eleven Heads of Department, seventy-one Teachers, a Business Services Manager, four Administration Officers, two Schools Officers, cleaning staff and an agricultural assistant.

Students are also able to access a team of support services including a Guidance Officer, School Based Police Officer, School Nurse, Youth Worker, Indigenous Liaison Officer, School Chaplain, a Youth Support Coordinator, and a Referral Room Coordinator.

Campus 

The large school contains many single-level buildings. Each building is purpose-built to accommodate for the curriculum offered.
Additionally, the school offers a large multi-purpose Hall, which can allow for upwards of 600 people during presentations. The Hall also allows for three Volleyball courts, indoor Cricket, Basketball and Rock Climbing. In 2009, the Hall was extended to accommodate for a new entrance way.

There are nine computer labs on the Campus, all of which comprise at least twenty computers that are no more than two years old; interactive whiteboards and projection equipment. A majority of the classrooms provide computer access and all of the classrooms in two of the teaching blocks have interactive whiteboards and/or extensive projection equipment.

By 2010, a new $2 million science building will be completed. This building will offer two new teaching labs and a computer room.

Each of these buildings is surrounded by extensive native vegetation, which attracts native fauna such as Koalas to the campus. There is a large farm which occupies a large proportion of the campus and also accommodates a dam, which provides water to the farm.

Curriculum 

The school offers a broad range of junior and senior subject to the students. In years 7 & 8 it is compulsory for the students to study all of the junior subjects offered. However, in years 9, 10, 11 and 12 the students are able to select for themselves.

Some of the subjects offered to both junior and senior students include:

– English
– Maths (Maths A, B and C are offered in years 11 and 12) 
– Science (Biology, Chemistry and Physics are offered in years 11 and 12)
– Studies Of Society and the Environment or S.O.S.E
– Geography (offered in years 10, 11 and 12)
– Ancient and Modern History (offered in years 10, 11 and 12)
– Legal Studies (offered in years 10, 11 and 12)
– Graphics (offered in years 10, 11 and 12)
– Industrial Technologies
– Computer Subjects (Information Processing Technology (IPT) and Information Communication Technology (ICT) are offered in year 11 and 12 with Computing offered in year 10)
– Visual Art
– Certificate 1 and 2 in Business, Visual Arts and/or Computing (offered in year 10 and years 11 and 12, respectively)
– Accounting (offered in years 11 and 12)
– Economics (offered in years 11 and 12)
– Business Communications and Technologies (offered in years 11 and 12)
– Health and Physical Education
– Agriculture studies
– Home Economics

Agriculture 

The school has extensive Agriculture Science subjects. These subjects allow students to gain a hands-on knowledge of animals and wildlife as the school has cattle, sheep, poultry, a hydroponic system, greenhouses and eatable gardens. In addition to these subjects, there are Cattle and Sheep teams. These teams have played an integral part in the school success in Cattle and Sheep competitions. No other school offers an Agriculture Department to the same calibre as Dakabin, due to a lack of facilities.

Sport 

Sporting houses
The school offers four sporting houses, which include Bradman, Cuthbert, Elliot and Fraser. Upon enrolment to Dakabin students are placed within these houses. Throughout the year there are opportunities for all students to participate in Swimming Carnivals, Athletics Carnivals and Sports' Days.

Sporting teams
The students are able to further their involvement in sport by joining a sporting team. There are over 65 teams in total, which include award-winning Volleyball, Cricket, Soccer Football, Golf and Netball male and female teams. These teams often make district, regional and state finals. In 2009, 25 teams competed in Metropolitan Quarter Finals, 8 competed in Metropolitan Semi Finals, 3 competed in Metropolitan Finals, 1 Metropolitan Champion – Yr10 Girls Touch Football, 1 Australian Baseball Representative Player.

Sporting facilities
Other than the multi-purpose Hall, there are extensive sporting facilities available to the students. There are two outdoor multi-purpose courts. One of these allows for Basketball, Tennis and Footstall. The other provides students with netball and an additional Basketball court. Additionally, there are three outdoor volleyball courts, a cricket pitch and an oval. These facilities are used constantly by students during Interschool Sports Matches, Health and Physical Education lessons and during lunch breaks.

Academic success 

The school has had academic success. Within the last two years, the students have received high OP results within the 1 to 15 bracket. In 2007 the percentage of students to receive an OP of between 1 and 15 was 70%. In 2008 the results were very similar. Over these two years, Dakabin's results were within the highest two of the Region.

Student involvement 

The students are encouraged to participate in a broad range of community activities as well as in school societies and clubs. As well as the ANZAC Day and Remembrance Day Ceremonies; the 40 Hour Famine, the Salvation Army Red Shield Appeal and the UNIFEM International Women's Day Breakfast are activities that students participate in annually.

In 2012 the school published "Crystal Vision", an eBook literary magazine from the Dakabin State High School Writers Group. Copies of the December issue are available from the School Website.

References

www.dakabinshs.eq.edu.au

Educational institutions established in 1978
Public high schools in Queensland
Schools in South East Queensland
1978 establishments in Australia